In mathematics, a torsion sheaf is a sheaf of abelian groups  on a site for which, for every object U, the space of sections  is a torsion abelian group. Similarly, for a prime number p, we say a sheaf  is p-torsion if every section over any object is killed by a power of p.

A torsion sheaf on an étale site is the union of its constructible subsheaves.

See also  
 Twisted sheaf

Notes

References 

 J. S. Milne, Étale Cohomology

Sheaf theory